Thomas Bedingfield may refer to:

 Thomas Bedingfield (judge) (c. 1592–1661), English judge and politician
 Thomas Bedingfield (MP for Eye) (1554–1636), English lawyer and politician
 Thomas Bedingfield (d. 1613), gentleman pensioner to Elizabeth I of England